The black-billed seed finch (Sporophila atrirostris) is a species of bird in the family Thraupidae.
It is found in the western Amazon Basin (Ecuador, Peru and northwestern Bolivia).

References

black-billed seed finch
Birds of the Ecuadorian Amazon
Birds of the Peruvian Amazon
black-billed seed finch
black-billed seed finch
black-billed seed finch
Taxonomy articles created by Polbot